Arbatax is the largest hamlet (frazione) of Tortolì, Sardinia, in Italy.  With almost 5,000 inhabitants, it is also the third largest town in its province (Nuoro) by population, after Lanusei municipality (5,700) and Tortolì proper  (5,300).

History 
The origin of the name Arbatax is uncertain; according to tradition it derived from the Arabic for "14th Tower" and refers, probably, to the nearby watchtower built by the Spaniards to protect the territory from the incursion of Arab pirates.

The founders of Arbatax  were Campanian fishermen from the island of Ponza, located in Lazio, close to the coast of the Italian Peninsula.

The location assumed importance in the 1960s after the construction of  the main Sardinian paper mill.

Geography 
The town is situated by the Tyrrhenian Sea, 5 km east of Tortolì.

Transport 
The port is used by ferries to and from Civitavecchia and Olbia and is also monopolized by the marine construction company Intermare, which builds gas rigs and vessels. The marina is one of the cheapest in Sardinia.

The town is connected to Lanusei and Cagliari by a narrow gauge railway, today used for touristic purposes, owned by Ferrovie della Sardegna.

The closest airport is the Tortolì Airport, about 4 km from the town.

Economy 
Today, the economy is focused on tourism and industry. Arbatax is home to a factory dedicated to the building of oil platforms, controlled by the Italian oil and gas industry contractor Saipem. Mussels are farmed in the nearby lagoon and fresh fish are on sale from the fishing cooperative. The red rocks are a tourist attraction.

Gallery

See also 
 Tortolì
 Nuoro
 Tourist destinations of Sardinia
 Tirrenia di Navigazione

References

External links

Tortolì-Arbatax Airport (IT)
Comune of Tortolì (IT)
Arbatax on marenostrum.it (IT)
Arbatax on Sardegna.net (IT)

Frazioni of the Province of Nuoro
Tortolì